This is the list of world records progression in men's weightlifting from 1993 and 1997. Records are maintained in each weight class for the snatch lift, clean and jerk lift, and the total for both lifts. The International Weightlifting Federation restructured its weight classes in 1993, nullifying earlier records and again in 1998 and 2018.

54 kg

Snatch

Clean & jerk

Total

59 kg

Snatch

Clean & jerk

Total

64 kg

Snatch

Clean & jerk

Total

70 kg

Snatch

Clean & jerk

Total

76 kg

Snatch

Clean & jerk

Total

83 kg

Snatch

Clean & jerk

Total

91 kg

Snatch

Clean & jerk

Total

99 kg

Snatch

Clean & jerk

Total

108 kg

Snatch

Clean & jerk

Total

+108 kg

Snatch

Clean & jerk

Total

See also
 World record progression men's weightlifting
 World record progression men's weightlifting (1998–2018)
 World record progression women's weightlifting
 World record progression women's weightlifting (1998–2018)

References
Weightlifting - Progression of World records
World records in old categories until 1997

External links
IWF official website

Weightlifting record progressions
Olympic weightlifting records